Penkino is a rural locality (a village) in Penkinskoye Rural Settlement, Kameshkovsky District, Vladimir Oblast, Russia. The population was 403 as of 2010. There are 8 streets.

Geography 
Penkino is located on the Klyazma River, 30 km south of Kameshkovo (the district's administrative centre) by road. Krasnoramenye is the nearest rural locality.

References 

Rural localities in Kameshkovsky District
Vladimirsky Uyezd